Luis Fernando Saldías Muños (born 27 February 1997) is a Bolivian footballer who plays in Bolivian Primera División for Club Atlético Palmaflor.

He made his full debut for Bolivia on the 10 October 2020, against Brazil.

References

External links
 

Living people
1997 births
Bolivian footballers
Bolivian Primera División players
Bolivia international footballers
Association football forwards
The Strongest players
Club Blooming players
Oriente Petrolero players
C.D. Palmaflor del Trópico players
Sportspeople from Santa Cruz de la Sierra